Saʿumu was a king (Lugal) of the second Mariote kingdom who reigned c. 2416–2400 BC. Some scholars, such as Joseph Martin Pagan, interpreted the king's name as derived from the root "ś-y-m", a cognate of the Akkadian word "šâmu-m", meaning "to buy".

In a letter written by the later Mariote king Enna-Dagan, Saʿumu is attested launching a major attack on the Eblaites. The king's campaigns recorded in the letter were concentrated in the middle Euphrates valley east of Emar, where he defeated the cities of Tibalat and Ilwani, leaving ruins in the mountainous area of Angai. Saʿumu continued his war defeating the cities of Ra'ak, Nirum, Ashaldu and Badul, leaving ruins in the borders of Nahal's region.

See also
Eblaite-Mariote war

Notes

Citations

25th-century BC rulers
Kings of Mari
25th-century BC people